Richard Ingham (born 25 March 1954, Wakefield, West Yorkshire, England) is a composer, performer and educator.  He was director of the World Saxophone Congress XVI held July 2012 in St Andrews, Fife, Scotland.

Biography
A graduate of the University of York, his study period at Indiana University with Eugene Rousseau was a major influence on his career. After many years as Visiting Professor of Music at the University of St Andrews, he is now Fellow in New Music and Composer in Residence at the university. He was also Principal Guest Conductor of the National Saxophone Choir of Great Britain in their tours of China and the Czech Republic, and is Principal Conductor of the Aberdeenshire Saxophone Orchestra. His many compositions are frequently performed. Recent works include "Rhynie Man" for solo horn, "Nature Morte au Panier" for solo viola, "Night Invaded the Heavens" (after Ovid) for 15 violas, Robinson, in collaboration with Fife poet Brian Johnstone, for two narrators, two jazz soloists and jazz orchestra. His works for saxophone include "Through a Landscape" and "Walking the Cowgate" for quartet, "Double Concerto" for saxophone, accordion, strings and percussion, "From Pennan to Penang" for saxophone and accordion.

As an educator, Richard was for some years saxophone consultant at the Royal Welsh College of Music in addition to his positions as Professor of Saxophone at both Royal Northern College of Music and Leeds College of Music.  Notable past students include Simon Cosgrove, a finalist in the 2010 BBC Young Musician of the Year competition and Andy Goldsmith, saxophonist with RapsodieXarte, who has also performed with one of Richard’s accompanists, Alan Cuckston.

In a recent tour of China and Japan, he gave a jazz workshop at Beijing's Pop Academy, and directed the celebrated 80-strong saxophone orchestra of Showa Academy. As an orchestral player he has worked with the Royal Liverpool Philharmonic Orchestra, the Halle Orchestra, Opera North and the English Northern Philharmonia. He has also worked at the National Theatre, London, (on WX7 and saxophone) on several productions. Concerto performances have included works by Sally Beamish, Charlotte Harding and John Williams.
         
He released two albums recently – Scenes From a Mountain for saxophone and piano, and From Pennan to Penang for saxophone and accordion. His new solo album, Notes From a Small Country, supported by Creative Scotland, features contemporary repertoire for soprano saxophone and wind synthesiser, including his own works, as well as others by Tom David Wilson, Sally Beamish, Ian Stewart, Charlotte Harding. 

He is the editor of the Cambridge Companion to the Saxophone (Cambridge University Press, 1999), published in English and Chinese. He is the President of the Clarinet and Saxophone Society of Great Britain, a member of the Comité International du Saxophone, and a Yamaha artist. He has given recitals in Spain, Poland, Canada, Ireland, USA, India, Slovenia, Latvia and China. He has performed by invitation at every World Saxophone Congress since 1985, and has released several albums. Performances have included UK premieres of works by Ryo Noda, Erwin Schulhoff, Ramon Ricker and François Rossé. He is a member of Trio Verso, and was a member of the Northern Saxophone Quartet for 26 years. He has presented masterclasses in conservatoires in the UK and abroad, and in his capacity as a jazz educator gives many jazz workshops and lectures throughout the country events.

Publications
 Cambridge Companion to the Saxophone – Cambridge University Press, editions in English and Chinese
 Style Masters for Saxophone – Kevin Mayhew Publications
 Music Medals – ABRSM Publishing
 Distant Song in Sax Scorchers – Saxtet Publications
 Mrs Malcolm, Her Reel – Funky Freuchie, Saxtet Publications

Compositions
 Peter and the RTO – for narrator and orchestra was premiered in Edinburgh in 2002
 From Pennan to Penang, a suite for soprano saxophone and accordion was given its first performance in February 2004. Movements: – A Postcard for Peter – The Colours of Kingsbarns – Aumagne Walking – Fog at Whitsand Bay – Picasso and the Temples of Penang – St Patrick Prays For Peace in the Gardens of Craiglockhart – Kuching – Ballyfa Evening – Singapore – Moments with the Golden Tortoise – Two Boats at Oysterhaven – Midsummer in Pennan
 Ballyfa Evening – for solo soprano saxophone, has received many performances, most recently by the Irish saxophonist Gerard McChrystal
 Distant Song – for solo saxophone, premiered in Ireland in 2002
 His Inevitable Lament – for solo saxophone, commissioned and first performed in 2005.
 Through a Landscape – for saxophone quartet, commissioned and premiered in Leeds in 2005 and was performed several times in 2006
 The St Andrews Suite – for jazz orchestra received its first performance in April 2004
 Mrs Malcolm, Her Reel (Funky Freuchie) – has received many performances throughout the UK in various chamber ensemble arrangements. The saxophone choir version is published by Saxtet Publications and was recently performed in China by the National Saxophone Choir of Great Britain, conducted by the composer.
 Double Concerto – for saxophone, accordion and strings was premiered in Scotland in 2005. Movements: – Evening in Hyderabad – Torridon Levels – Return to Kingsbarns
 Nine Pieces for Five Players – for wind quintet was premiered in Cambridge in 2006. Five of the movements are available for saxophone quintet SSATB
 Drift o Rain on Moorland Stane, music with poems by Marion Angus was premiered in St Andrews as part of the StAnza festival in March 2007.
 Taj Mahal – for the National Saxophone Choir of Great Britain (premiered in Birmingham, 2009)
 Fanfare – for brass quintet, premiered in St Andrews in 2009
 Nature Morte au Panier – for solo viola, 2009, commissioned by University of St Andrews
 From Mountain to Sea – Suite for Saxophone Orchestra, 2008, commissioned by Aberdeenshire Saxophone Orchestra. Movements: – From Aboyne to Logie Coldstone – Bennachie – Tunes in the Dunes in June – An African Song in Johnshaven – The Pink Castle – It's Not Cold!?
 Walking the Cowgate – for saxophone quartet, for Scottish Saxophone Ensemble, premiered in Bangkok, July 2009

Discography
 1987 – Nomad – a solo performance of a commissioned work by Archer Endrich
 1992 – Second Revolution – with the Northern Saxophone Quartet
 2001 – Scenes From A Mountain – with pianist Mary McCarthy
 2003 – The Definitive Ashton Collection – with the Northern Saxophone Quartet
 2003 – Tribune – with the Tribune Octet
 2004 – The Cowles Collection – with the Northern Saxophone Quartet
 2010 – Stormchaser – with Trio Verse
 2010 – Sax Circus – conducting the National Saxophone Choir
 2011 – Scenes From A Mountain – re-release with pianist Mary McCarthy
 2012 – From Pennan to Penang – with pianist Mary McCarthy
 2012 – Notes From A Small Country

Ensembles
Richard runs many varied music groups across the UK, as listed below.
 Trio Verso
 Aberdeenshire Saxophone Orchestra
 ReBirth of the Cool – Richard and his Organisation
 Relentless Biscuit – Big Band. St. Andrews newest and tastiest band.
 The Really Terrible Orchestra – Guest Conductor
 Ensemble 2021 – Contemporary classical music at the University of St. Andrews
 The Scorch Ensemble – 21st century sax ensemble
 Duo: Richard Ingham (saxophone) and Mary McCarthy (accordion, piano)
 Duo: Richard Ingham (saxophone) and Richard Michael (piano)
 Duo: Richard Ingham (saxophone) and Alan Cuckston (piano)

References

External links
  Largo Music
  Richard Ingham's website
  Publications
  Cambridge Companion to the Saxophone
  Music Medals
  Distant Song in Sax Scorchers
  Mrs Malcolm, Her Reel
  Compositions
  Discography
  The National Saxophone Choir of Great Britain
  The Really Terrible Orchestra
  Mary McCarthy
  Scenes From A Mountain

Sources
 http://www.wscxvi.com/
 http://www.saxtetpublications.com/composers/composer.php?composer=ringham
 http://cassgb.org/president-profile.php?president=Richard-Ingham
 http://norvikmusic.co.uk/html/richard_ingham_-_clarinet_sax
 

1954 births
Living people